CK One is a citrus aromatic chypre unisex fragrance developed by Alberto Morillas and Harry Fremont for Calvin Klein.

Composition and marketing
CK One's top notes include pineapple,  mandarin orange, papaya, bergamot, cardamom and lemon. Its middle notes include nutmeg, violet, orris root, jasmine, lily-of-the-valley and rose. Its base notes include sandalwood, amber, musk, cedar and oakmoss.

The fragrance is considered to be a unisex fragrance, and was the first unisex fragrance to gain wide popularity in the US. It has also been described as the first fragrance to be openly marketed as unisex.

History and sales
CK One was launched in 1994. It became a best-seller, making more than $5 million in its first 10 days. It generated about $90 million (USD) annually in the mid-1990s. As of 2007, the scent's sales in the United States were still about $30 million annually.

References

Perfumes
1994 introductions
Designer perfumes